Lynn is an unincorporated community in Polk County, North Carolina, United States. Lynn has a post office with ZIP code 28750. Its incorporation was repealed in 1965.

References

Unincorporated communities in Polk County, North Carolina
Unincorporated communities in North Carolina